Malayotyphlops castanotus, also known as the brown-backed blind snake or Wynn's worm snake, is a species of snake in the Typhlopidae family.

References

castanotus
Reptiles described in 1993